In mathematics, the Atiyah conjecture is a collective term for a number of statements about restrictions on possible values of -Betti numbers.

History
In 1976, Michael Atiyah introduced -cohomology of manifolds with a free co-compact action of a discrete countable group (e.g. the universal cover of a compact manifold together with the action of the fundamental group by deck transformations.) Atiyah defined also  numbers as von Neumann dimensions of the resulting  groups, and computed several examples, which all turned out to be rational numbers. He therefore asked if it is possible for -Betti numbers to be irrational.

Since then, various researchers asked more refined questions about possible values of -Betti numbers, all of which are customarily referred to as "Atiyah conjecture".

Results
Many positive results were proven by Peter Linnell. For example, if the group acting is a free group, then the -Betti numbers are integers.

The most general question open as of late 2011 is whether -Betti numbers are rational if there is a bound on the orders of finite subgroups of the group which acts. In fact, a precise relationship between possible denominators and the orders in question is conjectured; in the case of torsion-free groups, this statement generalizes the zero-divisors conjecture. For a discussion see
the article of B. Eckmann.

In the case there is no such bound, Tim Austin showed in 2009 that -Betti numbers can assume transcendental values. Later it was shown that in that case they can be any non-negative real numbers.

References

 

 

Conjectures
Cohomology theories
Differential geometry
Differential topology